Dulce Carranza (born ) is a Mexican female volleyball player. She is a member of the Mexico women's national volleyball team and played for Nuevo León in 2014. 

She was part of the Mexico national team at the 2014 FIVB Volleyball Women's World Championship in Italy, and the 2015 FIVB World Grand Prix.

Clubs
  Nuevo León (2014)

References

1990 births
Living people
Mexican women's volleyball players
Place of birth missing (living people)